Ash is a village in Devon, England and is situated approximately  south-west of Dartmouth.

References

Villages in South Hams
Stoke Fleming